Space Shot is a type of amusement ride manufactured by S&S - Sansei Technologies.

The ride is a drop tower type attraction that uses compressed air to rapidly propel riders up the tower then gently lower them with a series of air-cushioned bounces back to the loading platform.

The first space shot to be built in the United States was the Spaceshot at D&D Adventure, a now defunct family entertainment center. The former was the prototype with the first model going to Action Park in Vernon, NJ. Built in early 1995 and opening for the 1995 season.
The tallest space shot in the world is the La Venganza del Enigma in Parque Warner Madrid at

Statistics
 Ride Speed: 60 miles per hour (98 kilometers per hour)
 Capacity: 12 or 16 per tower, depending on seating configuration
 Altogether passenger minimum weight: 222 pounds
 Total passenger maximum weight: 2,500 pounds (1090 kilograms)
 Total passenger minimum height: 48 inches (1.22 meters)
 Ride duration: 50 seconds
 Height: Varies from 90 feet (28 meters) to over 300 feet (92 meters)
 Footprint: 7 feet 6 inches for 12 seats (2.28 meters), 10 feet (3 meters) for 16 seat configuration
 Weight (empty): 120,000 pounds (52,320 kilogram)

Ride mechanism
 The mechanism consists of a central tower around which rows of seats are placed with the riders facing outward away from the tower. In the center of the tower is a large columnar pipe system. Threaded through the main pipe column is a cable that is attached to a piston on one end, looped over a pulley at the top of the tower and attached to the seat carriage on the other.

In the loading position, the seat carriage is at the base of the tower and the piston is at the top of the pipe column. Once the ride has been loaded, the seats are lifted slightly off the ground and loaded seats are weighed in order to calculate the amount of air pressure needed to safely propel the seats up the tower. Upon charging the air system to the correct pressure, compressed air is injected into the central column pushing the piston rapidly downward. As the piston moves down, it pulls the cable downward over the pulley at the top, propelling the seat carriage up the outside of the tower.

Upon exhausting the air from the pressure system, the carriage descends, drawing the piston back up the pipe column. As the piston moves up, the air inside the pipe column alternately compresses and expands, causing the carriage to bounce several times. With each bounce, a pressure relief valve at the top of the pipe column releases some of the compressed air making each successive bounce smaller until the carriage reaches the loading platform.

Below is a visual representation of the ride cycle:

See also
 Turbo Drop
 Double Shot

References

External links
 
Official specifications

Drop tower rides
S&S – Sansei Technologies